Brandon John Staley (born December 10, 1982) is an American football coach who is the head coach for the Los Angeles Chargers of the National Football League (NFL). He previously served as the defensive coordinator for the Los Angeles Rams in 2020 and also served as an assistant coach for the Denver Broncos and Chicago Bears.

Playing career
Staley went to the University of Dayton and started two years at quarterback for the Flyers guiding the team to a 16–5 record from 2003 to 2004. He finished his playing career at Mercyhurst College, playing on the football team in 2005.

Coaching career

College
Brandon began his coaching career as a graduate assistant at Northern Illinois from 2006 to 2008 before working with defensive linemen and special teams at Division III St. Thomas in 2009.
In 2010 and 2011 Staley served as the associate head coach and defensive coordinator at Hutchinson Community College. He spent the 2012 season at Tennessee as a graduate assistant. Staley would then spend three seasons (2013, 2015, 2016) as the defensive coordinator/secondary coach with John Carroll University. 2014 was spent as the defensive coordinator/linebackers coach at James Madison University.

Chicago Bears
In 2017, Staley was hired by the Chicago Bears as their outside linebackers coach.

Denver Broncos
On January 15, 2019, Staley was hired by the Denver Broncos as their outside linebackers coach, reuniting with head coach Vic Fangio.

Los Angeles Rams
On January 16, 2020, Staley was hired by the Los Angeles Rams as their defensive coordinator, replacing Wade Phillips. In his only year as coordinator in 2020, Staley helped guide the Rams defense to 1st in points and total yards allowed, positioning himself as an attractive head coaching candidate around the league.

Los Angeles Chargers
On January 17, 2021, Staley was hired as head coach of the Los Angeles Chargers to replace Anthony Lynn.

On September 12, 2021, Staley made his regular-season head coaching debut against the Washington Football Team and led the Chargers to a 20–16 victory.

Staley led the Chargers to a 9–7 record through the first 16 games of the season. However, against the Las Vegas Raiders in Week 18 in a win or tie or go home situation, Staley came under scrutiny for two decisions during the game. The first involved a failed fourth down conversion on the Chargers' own 18-yard line, giving the Raiders a short field, which they would score on to extend their lead to 12. The second was calling a timeout with 38 seconds left in the overtime period with the Raiders at the Chargers 39 yard line. Staley claimed he called the timeout to get the right defensive personnel on the field as the Raiders were running the ball. Following the game there was conjecture that the timeout proved to be costly for the Chargers as the Raiders kicked a 47-yard field goal as time expired, winning 35–32, and eliminating the Chargers from playoff contention. However, when discussing the moment on a podcast, Raiders' interim head coach Rich Bisaccia stated that “the timeout was really irrelevant", Bisaccia is now a special teams coach for the Packers.  

In the 2022 season, Staley led the Chargers to a 10–7 record, finishing in second place in the AFC West. The Chargers finished as the AFC's 5th seed and played the 4th seed 9–8 Jacksonville Jaguars on January 14, 2023, in the AFC Wild Card round. After starting the game with a 27–0 lead, the Jaguars came back to win the game 31–30 with a field goal as time expired. It was the third-largest comeback in NFL playoff history.

Head coaching record

Personal life
Staley was diagnosed at 24 years old with Hodgkin lymphoma, but has been cancer-free for over a decade following chemotherapy at the Cleveland Clinic.

Staley married Amy Ward in 2011. They have three children.

References

External links
 Los Angeles Chargers profile

1982 births
Living people
American football quarterbacks
People from Perry, Ohio
Sportspeople from Greater Cleveland
Coaches of American football from Ohio
Players of American football from Ohio
Dayton Flyers football players
Mercyhurst Lakers football players
Northern Illinois Huskies football coaches
St. Thomas (Minnesota) Tommies football coaches
Hutchinson Blue Dragons football coaches
Tennessee Volunteers football coaches
John Carroll Blue Streaks football coaches
James Madison Dukes football coaches
Chicago Bears coaches
Denver Broncos coaches
Los Angeles Rams coaches
National Football League defensive coordinators
Los Angeles Chargers head coaches